Gerard Escoda Nogués (26 May 1972 – 27 January 2023) was a Spanish professional footballer who played as a forward.

Career
Born in Reus, Escoda played for Reus, Real Zaragoza B, Gimnàstic de Tarragona, Lleida, Villarreal and Salamanca.

Escoda later served as the sporting director of Sabadell. He died on 27 January 2023, at the age of 50.

References

1972 births
2023 deaths
Spanish footballers
Association football forwards
La Liga players
Segunda División players
Segunda División B players
CF Reus Deportiu players
Real Zaragoza B players
Gimnàstic de Tarragona footballers
UE Lleida players
Villarreal CF players
UD Salamanca players
CE Sabadell FC non-playing staff
People from Reus